Padre Las Casas may refer to:
 Padre Las Casas, Chile
 Padre Las Casas, Dominican Republic